Channing of the Northwest is a 1922 American silent drama film directed by Ralph Ince and starring Eugene O'Brien, Gladden James and Norma Shearer.

Plot
As described in a film magazine, Channing (O'Brien), a member of the Northwest Mounted Police and known to his fellows as "the Duke," is sent to a town to watch a gang of outlaws that have crossed the border from the United States and are suspected in the shooting of a Northwest Mounted Policeman. He meets Cicily Varden (Naldi) who is engaged to a youth living with the family. This young man has fallen in with the gang at McCook's saloon, and in an altercation shoots a man. The young woman attempts to hide him when Channing enters the cabin. Because her fiancé has broken his promise not to go to McCook's, she breaks her engagement with him and declares her love for Channing. This meets with the approval of her father when he learns of the circumstances. The film is noted as having several flashbacks regarding Channing's life in England prior to enlisting in the Northwest Mounted.

Cast
 Eugene O'Brien as Channing  
 Gladden James as Jim Franey  
 Norma Shearer as Jess Driscoll  
 James Seeley as Tom Driscoll  
 Pat Hartigan as Sport McCool  
 Nita Naldi as Cicily Varden  
 Harry Lee as McCool's man  
 Jack W. Johnston as Buddy  
 C. Coulter as Channing's Uncle

References

Bibliography
Jack Jacobs & Myron Braum. The films of Norma Shearer. A. S. Barnes, 1976.

External links

1922 films
Films directed by Ralph Ince
American silent feature films
1920s English-language films
American black-and-white films
Selznick Pictures films
1920s American films